William Fellowes Morgan Jr. (March 13, 1889 – December 23, 1977) was the President of the Middle Atlantic Oyster Fisheries in 1925, and was the Commissioner of Public Markets for New York City around 1934 through 1942, for at least eight years. He oversaw the opening of The Bronx Terminal Market in 1935. His father was William Fellowes Morgan Sr. (1861–1943) a refrigerated storage business tycoon; his mother was tennis player Emma Leavitt-Morgan (1865–1956). His sisters were Pauline Morgan Dodge and Beatrice Morgan Pruyn Goodrich.

Lawsuits
1934 June 1, 1934; Matter of Cassidy v. Morgan
1940 May 27, 1940; Russo v. Morgan
1940 May 31, 1940; Matter of Joyce v. Morgan

References

Businesspeople from New York City
Commissioners of Public Markets
1889 births
1977 deaths
20th-century American businesspeople